Bosnia and Herzegovina competed at the 2022 Winter Olympics in Beijing, China, from 4 to 20 February 2022.

The Bosnia and Herzegovina team consisted of six athletes (three per gender) competing in three sports. Elvedina Muzaferija and Mirza Nikolajev were the country's flagbearer during the opening ceremony. Alpine skier Strahinja Erić was the flagbearer during the closing ceremony.

Competitors
The following is the list of number of competitors who participated at the Games per sport/discipline.

Alpine skiing

By meeting the basic qualification standards, Bosnia and Herzegovina qualified one male and one female alpine skier, and received one more female quota during reallocation.

Cross-country skiing

By meeting the basic qualification standards Bosnia and Herzegovina qualified one male and one female cross-country skier.

Due to high winds and adverse weather conditions, the men's 50 km freestyle competition on 19 February was shortened to 30 km.

Distance

Sprint

Luge

Based on the results during the 2021–22 Luge World Cup season, Bosnia and Herzegovina qualified 1 sled in the men's singles.

References

Nations at the 2022 Winter Olympics
2022
Winter Olympics